Chris Murphy (born May 31, 1968) is an American politician. He is a member of the South Carolina House of Representatives from the 98th District, serving since 2010.

He is a member of the Republican party.

References

Living people
1968 births
Republican Party members of the South Carolina House of Representatives
21st-century American politicians